Bogdan Zimonjić, (1813 – 21 January 1909) was a Serbian Orthodox priest and Vojvoda (military commander) in two major uprisings against the Ottoman Empire in 19th-century Herzegovina: in 1852–62, and 1875–78. He is mentioned in archival sources along with other Serbian freedom-fighting priests, including Jovica Ilić and his associates Pavle Tvrtković, Mile Vitković, and Stevan Avramović, who rebelled against the occupiers, and another priest, Petko Jagodić of Šamac, who led the next revolt, while history records further armed clashes led by priests Mile Čulibrk, Marko Popović, Vaso Kovačević, and Gaćina.

His son Petar Zimonjić, the metropolitan of Dabar-Bosnia, was killed by the Ustaše regime in the Independent State of Croatia in June 1941.

References

Secondary sources
 Enciklopedija Jugoslavije 1971. JLZ, Tom 8, Zagreb.

1813 births
1909 deaths
Serbs of Bosnia and Herzegovina
19th-century Serbian people
Serbian military leaders
Serbian revolutionaries
People from Gacko
Serbian Orthodox clergy
Armed priests